West Stonesdale is a hamlet in the Yorkshire Dales, North Yorkshire, England. The secluded village is near Keld to the south, Tan Hill to the north and is both  from Grinton (west north west) and Askrigg (north west). A road heads north from the B6270 through West Stonesdale to Tan Hill. Where the road diverges from the B6270 is the site of Currack Force, a waterfall on Stonesdale Beck which drops  before entering the Swale.

West Stonesdale used to be in the ecclesiastical parish of Grinton, but now forms part of the civil parish of Muker. The Pennine Way is to the east of the hamlet on the far side of Stonesdale Beck. To the north, just before Startindale Gill becomes Stonedale Beck is West Stonesdale Lead Mine, which between 1850 and 1861 was operated by Christopher Lonsdale Bradley. The site of the mine and its associated workings are now listed as a scheduled monument. Coal was also mined above West Stonesdale, with Stonesdale Moor being dotted with former pit workings. Coal was mined as far back as 1384 and was transported to Richmond in the east. The coal was poor quality by comparison to other sources, but the industry was important enough in the area to warrant a turnpike road being built from Tan Hill down through Arkengarthdale.

References

External links

 West Stonesdale in the Upper Dales website.
Sketch of building in West Stonesdale

Villages in North Yorkshire